Vice Admiral Sir Roy William "Gus" Halliday,  (27 June 1923 – 23 November 2007) was a British naval pilot who saw service in the Second World War, in the British Pacific Fleet and subsequently became Director-General Intelligence in Britain's Defence Intelligence Staff from 1981 to 1984.

War service
Halliday studied at William Ellis School and University College School before volunteering in 1939 for the Royal Navy. While he awaited his call-up papers, he worked as a trawler deck-hand on Breadwinner, out of Lowestoft. His air training took place in the United States (still formally neutral at that time) at the naval air station at Grosse Ile, near Detroit and at Pensacola, Florida. After qualifying, he was posted to a squadron of Grumman Avengers, aboard the escort carrier  in the Gulf of Mexico.

After three months period on anti-submarine patrols in the north Atlantic, Halliday was posted to a shore station, RNAS Hatston in Orkney, guarding against sorties by German warships. There were air raids on Japanese installations and in support of 14th Army operations.

Whelp's first lieutenant, Prince Philip of Greece and Denmark, lent Halliday a spare uniform and subsequently accompanied him on a "run ashore" in Fremantle.

Halliday was back on Victorious in time to take part in the raids on the airfields on the Sakishima Islands in March to May 1945, for his efforts, he was awarded a DSC in addition to the Mention in Dispatches earned during Operation Meridian.

After the Japanese surrender, Halliday learned that his cabin-mate, Ken Burrenston, who had been shot down over Palembang, had been beheaded by the Japanese at Changi, two days after the Japanese surrender.

Post-war
Halliday returned to Britain on the troopship Rangitiki with his squadron commander, David Foster, who subsequently became president of Colgate-Palmolive. On return to the UK, he was offered, and accepted, a permanent commission in the Royal Navy (16 March 1946) and took up a post as a test pilot at Boscombe Down. The 104th swept left-over Japanese mines in the Celebes Sea and chased pirates, who desisted once the ready use of capital punishment by the civil authorities became known.

The next appointment was for two years as naval assistant to the Chief of Naval Information at the Admiralty. During this time, Halliday closed down a leak of information to the press. Another sea posting ensued in 1964, as second in command of commando carrier  and commander of its air operations, for which he learnt to fly helicopters. Albion was a busy posting, supporting operations in the Radfan and Aden and in Borneo during the Indonesian Confrontation.

Halliday was appointed Deputy Director Naval Air Warfare in 1966, Captain Far East Fleet and Western Fleet in 1970 and Commodore Amphibious Warfare in 1971. He went on to be Commodore Intelligence in 1973, Naval Attaché and Commander of the British Navy Staff in Washington D. C. in 1975 and Deputy Chief of Defence Staff (Intelligence) in 1978 before retiring in 1981.

In retirement Halliday served as Director-General Intelligence at the Ministry of Defence from 1981 to 1984.

References

External links
 Forgotten Army

|-

1923 births
2007 deaths
People educated at William Ellis School
Royal Navy vice admirals
Royal Navy personnel of World War II
Knights Commander of the Order of the British Empire
Recipients of the Distinguished Service Cross (United Kingdom)
Fleet Air Arm aviators
Royal Naval Volunteer Reserve personnel of World War II
Fleet Air Arm personnel of World War II